The Mormon cricket (Anabrus simplex) is a large insect that can grow to almost  in length. It lives throughout western North America in rangelands dominated by sagebrush and forbs. Despite its name, the Mormon cricket is actually a shield-backed katydid. It takes its name from Mormon settlers in Utah, who encountered them while pushing westward, and for the prominent role they play in the miracle of the gulls.

Although flightless, the Mormon cricket is capable of traveling up to two kilometers a day in its swarming phase, during which it is a serious agricultural pest and traffic hazard.

Description
Mormon crickets have variable coloration. The overall color may be black, brown, red, purple or green. The "shield" (pronotum or modified prothorax that covers vestigial wings) behind the head may have colored markings. The abdomen may appear to be striped. Females have a long ovipositor, which should not be mistaken for a stinger. Both sexes have long antennae.

Mormon crickets may undergo morphological changes triggered by high population densities, similar to those seen in locusts. The most noticeable change is in coloration: solitary individuals typically have green or purple coloration, while swarming individuals are often black, brown or red.

Life cycle

Mormon cricket eggs hatch mostly in the spring after they are laid, although in some areas eggs may take as many as five years to hatch. Hatching begins when soil temperatures reach . The nymphs pass through seven instars before reaching the adult stage, typically taking 60 to 90 days.

Breeding begins within 10 to 14 days of reaching the adult stage. The male passes to the female a large spermatophore which can be up to 27% of his body weight. The spermatophore is mostly food for the female to consume but also contains sperm to fertilize her eggs. This nuptial gift causes swarming-phase females to compete for males, a behavior not seen in solitary-phase females.

The female lays her eggs by thrusting her ovipositor deep into the soil. Each female can lay over one hundred eggs, with individual eggs having the appearance of a grain of rice with a gray to purplish color.

Swarming

The Mormon cricket exists in populations of relatively low density throughout most of its range. At certain times and places, however, population explosions or infestations occur in which large numbers of the crickets form roving bands. These bands may include millions of individuals and be found with densities of up to 100 individuals per square meter. These infestations may last years or even decades, and are characterized by a gradual increase and then decrease in population. The factors that trigger these infestations are poorly understood, but are thought to be weather-related.

Research published in 2006 shows that Mormon crickets move in these migratory bands, firstly to find new sources of the critical nutrients of protein and salt, and secondly to avoid being eaten by hungry crickets approaching from the rear. The Mormon cricket's cannibalistic behavior may lead to swarm behavior because crickets may need to move constantly forward to avoid attacks from behind.

When a large band crosses a road, it can create a safety hazard by causing distracted revulsion on the part of the driver, and by causing the road surface to become slick with crushed crickets. The crickets also can cause devastation to agriculture.

Diet

The Mormon cricket shows a marked preference for forbs, but grasses and shrubs such as sagebrush are also consumed. Mormon crickets also eat insects, including other Mormon crickets (especially individuals that have been killed or injured by automobiles or insecticides). Cannibalistic behavior may be a result of protein and salt deficiency; swarming behavior may in turn be a strategy to avoid predation by other Mormon crickets. A journal documenting an 1846 journey along the Oregon Trail describes an encounter with the crickets and notes their cannibalistic behavior:
The ground, for a strip of about four miles, was covered with black crickets of a large size. I saw some that were about three inches in length, and measuring about three-fourths of an inch in diameter; but the common size were two inches in length and one-half or five-eighths of an inch in diameter; their legs were large in proportion to the size of their bodies. Some were singing on stalks of wild sage; others crawling in every direction. Our teams made great havoc among them; so numerous were they that we crushed them at every step. As soon as one was killed, others of them would alight upon it and devour it.

Control

Mormon crickets are preyed upon by a wide variety of birds and mammals. These predators include California gulls, crows, coyotes and various rodents. There are no predators that specialize on Mormon crickets, which may be explained by the cricket's migratory habits and large population fluctuations. Gordius robustus, a species of horsehair worm, is a parasite of the Mormon cricket, as is Ooencyrtus anabrivorus.

The most common chemical control method used is carbaryl (typically sold as "Sevin Dust") bait. This bait kills both the Mormon crickets that eat the bait, and the crickets that eat crickets that have eaten the bait. Insecticides applied directly to crops may kill the insects, but due to the large size of swarms, this method usually does not save the crop from being destroyed.

As Mormon crickets are flightless, physical barriers may be effective. Barriers should be at least two feet high and made of a smooth material. Residents of some small towns have used boom boxes and sound systems playing hard rock music in attempts to divert the moving swarms away from crops and houses.

Another method for the control of Mormon crickets is the use of a biopesticide based on the fungus Nosema locustae. N. locustae is a naturally occurring microbe the spores of which kill orthopterans by interfering with the digestive system. According to the U.S. Environmental Protection Agency, its use has no adverse effect on humans or the environment.

Historical
Mormon crickets appear in some traditional Native American diets.

In 2003, officials in Utah, Idaho and Nevada said that year's infestation might be the worst in recent history.

References

External links 

 Mormon cricket (Anabrus simplex), University of Florida description page with images and male cricket song
 From Ants to People, an Instinct to Swarm, New York Times article

Insects of the United States
Tettigoniinae
Insects described in 1852
Taxa named by Samuel Stehman Haldeman